Vaishno Devi is a Hindu goddess. It also refers to :
Vaishno Devi Temple, a temple located in Katra, India.
Vaishnodevi Temple, Rourkela, another temple located in Rourkela.